In geography, location or place are used to denote a region (point, line, or area) on Earth's surface or elsewhere. The term location generally implies a higher degree of certainty than place, the latter often indicating an entity with an ambiguous boundary, relying more on human or social attributes of place identity and sense of place than on geometry.

Types

Locality
A locality, settlement, or populated place is likely to have a well-defined name but a boundary that is not well defined varies by context. London, for instance, has a legal boundary, but this is unlikely to completely match with general usage. An area within a town, such as Covent Garden in London, also almost always has some ambiguity as to its extent. In geography, location is considered to be more precise than "place".

Relative location
A relative location, or situation, is described as a displacement from another site. An example is "3 miles northwest of Seattle".

Absolute location
An absolute location can be designated using a specific pairing of latitude and longitude in a Cartesian coordinate grid (for example, a spherical coordinate system or an ellipsoid-based system such as the World Geodetic System) or similar methods. For example, the position of New York City in the United States can be expressed using the coordinate system as the location 40.7128°N (latitude), 74.0060°W (longitude).

Absolute locations are also relative locations, since even absolute locations are expressed relative to something else. For example, longitude is the number of degrees east or west of the Prime Meridian, a line arbitrarily chosen to pass through Greenwich, England. Similarly, latitude is the number of degrees north or south of the equator. Because latitude and longitude are expressed relative to these lines, a position expressed in latitude and longitude is also a relative location.

See also
 
 
 
 
 
 Locale (geographic)
 Location, Location, Location
 Location Location Location Australia

References

Cartography